US Post Office—Attica is a historic post office building located at Attica in Wyoming County, New York.  It was designed and built in 1936-1937 as a Works Progress Administration project, and is one of a number of post offices in New York State designed by the Office of the Supervising Architect of the Treasury Department, Louis A. Simon. It is a one-story brick structure on a stone watertable in the Colonial Revival style. The interior includes a mural painted in 1938 by Thomas Donnelly and titled Fall in the Genesee Country.

It was listed on the National Register of Historic Places in 1988.

References

External links
US Post Office - Attica, New York - U.S. National Register of Historic Places on Waymarking.com

Attica
Colonial Revival architecture in New York (state)
Government buildings completed in 1937
Works Progress Administration in New York (state)
Buildings and structures in Wyoming County, New York
National Register of Historic Places in Wyoming County, New York